Cologna is a village in the municipality of Poschiavo, canton of Graubünden, Switzerland.

Cologna may also refer to:
Cologna Veneta, a municipality in the province of Verona Italy
Cologna (Pellezzano), a civil parish of Pellezzano, Campania, Italy
Cologna (Tirano), a civil parish of Tirano, Lombardy, Italy

People with the surname
Dario Cologna (born 1986), Swiss skier, brother of Gianluca
Gianluca Cologna (born 1990), Swiss skier, brother of Dario

See also
Cologne (disambiguation)
Cologno (disambiguation)